Khmer Khe (or Hakka Khmer)  is a Khmeric language spoken in Stung Treng Province, Cambodia. It has an estimated lexical similarity of between 95-96% with Central Khmer.

Names
Alternate names for Khmer Khe include Khmer Khes and Khmer Kha-ak (Khmer Khak) (Herington & Ryan 2013:5).

Distribution
Khmer Khe is spoken in the following villages of Siem Pang District, Stung Treng Province, Cambodia (Herington & Ryan 2013:8).

Srae Sambour commune
Peam Khes
Kanhchanh Kouk / Kanhchanhkok
Srae Ruessei / Srae Ruessey
Kanhchanghterk / Kanhchanh Tuek / Kanhchangterk
Ket Mooeng / Ket Moeung
Preak Meas commune
Khes Kraom
Khes Svay
Pong Kriel / Pongkriel
Tuol Kruos (part of Pong Kriel)
Kham Pouk
Thma Keo commune
Nhang Sum / Nheang Sum
Mak Phoeung (part of Nhang Sum)
Khe Thom village (location unknown)

Bahnaric languages are spoken to the east of the Khmer Khe area, and Kuy, a Katuic language, is spoken to the west.

Phonology

Consonants

Vowels

References

Herington, Jennifer and Amy Ryan (2013). Sociolinguistic Survey of the Khmer Khe in Cambodia. Chiang Mai: Linguistics Institute, Payap University.

Languages of Cambodia
Khmer language